is a Japanese romantic comedy manga written and illustrated by Hidetaka Kakei. It is centered on four childhood friends and the romantic relationship between two of them. It was serialized in Comic Rush from 2004 to 2011. An anime television series adaptation was broadcast in 2006.

Plot
Kazuki Arisaka is excited that her childhood crush and next-door neighbor Yuji Kagura and his family are moving back after being away for ten years. However, her dreams of confessing her love for Yuji are shattered, when Yuji turns out to be a huge pervert. With the Arisaka and Kagura parents away overseas, they must deal with living together. Kazuki eventually realizes that Yuji has not really changed that much, but that she had ignored his behavior back then.

Characters

  A teenage girl who was fond of Yuji Kagura when they were kids, but her idealized image is shattered when she reunites with him and discovers he has become an obnoxiously lewd and perverted boy. She struggles to deal with her conflicted feelings for him over the course of the series. Her activities include being a member of the school's swimming club. She sometimes cooks, but adds ingredients that turn innocuous food into culinary disasters. Eventually she realizes that she still likes him despite his faults.

  Kazuki's next-door neighbor who returns at the beginning of the story. He was once a sweet innocent boy whom Kazuki fell in love with ten years ago, but is revealed to be an annoying openly lecherous guy. He regularly finds himself in situations where Kazuki is half-dressed, constantly has lewd fantasies, and sometimes ends up touching girls inappropriately. He is consequently punished by his sister and by Kazuki. Despite this, he exhibits a kind side that makes Kazuki wonder if he is a nice guy after all. It is revealed that he has been like that even as a kid, although Kazuki does not remember that part. It is suggested that he is in love with Kazuki, having directed most of his perverted actions towards her. Later in the story, he aspires to become a professional photographer and works as an intern.

  Yuuji's younger sister. Kazuki described her as being a crybaby when she was younger. Now that she has grown up she isn't quite the crybaby she used to be. Now she can be found pelting her older brother with air guns hidden in her teddy bear and her other puppets when her brother is acting vulgar. Though she shoots him without a moments hesitation, she does greatly care for her older brother and gets lonely without him suggesting she might have a brother complex, with stronger hints later as she becomes jealous of Yuuji's and Kazuki's growing relationship. Marie is mortally afraid of cats and insects. She is able to flee bugs yet is nearly paralyzed by the presence of cats, though they are drawn to her.

  Kazuki's older sister, who is constantly trying to get Kazuki and Yūji together and inadvertently (and intentionally) puts them both into embarrassing and lascivious situations. There are some indications that she considers the mishaps (and the arguments following them) funny. Hatsune is good at everything she does, from cooking to sports. She is also considered extremely beautiful, sporting a very curvaceous figure and well-endowed breasts. She likes to tease her sister by showing her how infatuated Yuuji is with her breasts. Hatsune frequently engages in cosplay around the house and can, from time to time, be quite frightening to the people around her. Unlike her younger sister and Marie, Hatsune is perfectly unafraid of insects - or anything else. Although it's implied that Hatsune's true weakness is worrying about her sister's health. When Kazuki fell ill with a cold, Hatsune became comically uncoordinated and unskillful every time she heard Kazuki sneeze. She delights in making her sister think that her affections may be more than sisterly, and in aiding Yuuji, even when he goes too far.

  Kazuki's friend who apparently likes to spy on people. She speaks with a Kansai dialect and is much more receptive to Yuuji's bawdy nature than Kazuki, claiming 'all boys are like that'. She also doesn't object to being the object of his attention and even goes so far as to give minor underwear displays. At one point she tells Kazuki if she didn't want Yūji, she would take him instead. She is just joking but it causes Kazuki to get depressed, especially seeing how well the two got along. Chihaya tells Kazuki that she was going to tell her that she wasn't interested in Yūji but that it would be a lie and encourages her to make up with Yūji before he was stolen away.

  Nīna is a blond-haired girl who goes to the same class as Marie. She has an American mother, a Japanese father, and a great deal of energy. She's very busty for her young age and is physically very active and extremely friendly, quickly attaching herself to Marie to the latter's initial displeasure. In the manga she has a crush on Yuji (who is torn between her being underage and her ample bust) and often refers to him as onii-chan.

  President of Yūji's class.

  Vice-president of Yūji's class. She uses any and all excuses to hit the class president. Even go so low as to hit him between the legs.

Media

Manga
 December 13, 2004 — 
 June 13, 2005 — 
 January 15, 2006 — 
 July 15, 2006 — 
 January 15, 2007 — 
 September 15, 2007 — 
 March 15, 2008 — 
 October 13, 2008 — 
 June 14, 2009 — 
 December 13, 2009 — 
 July 15, 2010 — 
 December 13, 2010 — 
 July 15, 2011 —

Anime

Episode list

Theme songs
Opening Theme: "DRAMATIC☆GIRLY" by Akemi Kanda, Sayaka Ohara, Erino Hazuki, Misaki Sekiyama & Ayumi Tsuji
Ending Theme: "Aitai Kimochi Kara~Placid Time~" by Akemi Kanda and Sayaka Ohara (episode 1-12)
"Oh My Darling" by Akemi Kanda (episode 13)

Notes

References

External links
  at Starchild 
 

Anime series
Anime series based on manga
Romantic comedy anime and manga
School life in anime and manga
Shōnen manga